Vladislav Igorevich Teryoshkin (born 16 July 1995) is a Russian football player. He plays for FC Avangard Kursk.

Club career
He made his debut in the Russian Professional Football League for FC Spartak-2 Moscow on 22 July 2013 in a game against FC Tambov. He made his Russian Football National League debut for Spartak-2 on 11 July 2015 in a game against FC Tom Tomsk.

References

External links
 
 
 

1995 births
Living people
Russian footballers
Sportspeople from Oryol
Association football goalkeepers
FC Spartak Moscow players
FC Spartak-2 Moscow players
FC Avangard Kursk players